Bernardini (March 23, 2003 – July 30, 2021) was a champion American Thoroughbred racehorse who won the 2006 Preakness Stakes and Travers Stakes.

Background
A son of A.P. Indy, he is out of Cara Rafaela, who won almost a million dollars during her racing career.  Her sire was Quiet American, who also produced Real Quiet, a horse that came within a nose of winning the 1998 Triple Crown.

Bernardini was trained by Thomas Albertrani. He was owned by Sheikh Mohammed bin Rashid al Maktoum, Vice President and Prime Minister of the United Arab Emirates and ruler of Dubai.

Racing career 
Bernardini's racing career began at age three at Gulfstream Park where he finished 4th in a maiden race. After a lung infection kept him from racing for 2 months, he came back with a 7 length win in a Maiden Special Weight over one mile at Gulfstream. On April 29, he easily won the Grade III Withers Stakes prior to going to the Preakness. Bernardini won the 2006 Preakness Stakes by 5 lengths in a time of 1:54.65, in the same race where Kentucky Derby winner Barbaro suffered the hind leg fracture that ultimately led to the Derby winner's death.

After his Preakness win, Sheikh Mohammed decided that Bernardini would not race in the June 10 Belmont Stakes, which meant that for only the 4th time in 60 years, neither the Kentucky Derby winner nor the Preakness winner was in the field.  A spokesman for Sheikh Mohammed's Darley Stable said that "...(Bernardini) climbed the ladder of competition quite quickly" and that "he deserves the break." Bernardini returned to the races on July 30 at Saratoga Race Course with a 10-length victory in the Jim Dandy Stakes over Minister's Bid.  On August 26, 2006, he won the Travers Stakes, also in Saratoga, by 7 lengths over Haskell Invitational winner and Kentucky Derby and Belmont Stakes runner-up, Bluegrass Cat. In the October 7 Jockey Club Gold Cup, Bernardini earned a 117 Beyer figure in a winning effort.

In the 2006 Breeders' Cup Classic at Churchill Downs, Bernardini tracked near the lead and passed the frontrunner, Brother Derek, at the quarter pole. He fought to hold off Invasor at the sixteenth pole but fell short by a length, finishing second.

He won the Eclipse Award for 3 Year Old Male of the Year for 2006 and was retired to stud at Darley.

Stud record
Bernardini has sired 16 individual Group/Grade 1 winners.

He was euthanised at Jonabell Farm in Kentucky on the 30 July 2021 due to complications from laminitis.

Notable progeny

c = colt, f = filly, g = gelding''

Bernardini's success as a sire has attracted many top broodmares and racemares. On January 26, 2011, Jerry Moss and his wife Ann announced that Bernardini would be the first mate of the 2010 Horse of the Year when Zenyatta was booked to him later that season. She foaled a colt, Cozmic One, in March 2012. He has been a disappointment on the track, finishing badly in both of his starts. Zenyatta's dam and 2008 Kentucky Broodmare of the Year Vertigineux produced a debut-winning Bernardini filly named Eblouissante in 2009.

Visiting Bernardini in 2012 were 2009 Horse of the Year and American Champion Three-Year-Old Filly Rachel Alexandra and 2010 American Champion Three-Year-Old Filly Blind Luck. The 2013 filly produced by Rachel Alexandra, Rachel's Valentina, is a Grade I stakes winner and was runner-up to American Champion Two-Year-Old Filly Songbird, and widely considered the second-best two-year old of either gender in 2015.

Bernardini was euthanized on July 30, 2021, after complications from laminitis. He was 18.

Racing record

Pedigree

References

Bernardini Statistics and Media, NTRA
Bernardini's retirement

2003 racehorse births
2021 racehorse deaths
Preakness Stakes winners
Racehorses bred in Kentucky
Eclipse Award winners
American Grade 1 Stakes winners
Thoroughbred family 4-m